Daniel Guzmán Castañeda (born 31 December 1965) is a Mexican former professional footballer and manager. Nicknamed "El Travieso," he played for 15 years for various clubs in Mexico. His son Daniel Guzmán Jr. is also a football player.

Honours

Player
UdeG
Copa México: 1990–91

Atlante
Mexican Primera División: 1992–93

Manager
Santos Laguna
Mexican Primera División: Clausura 2008

Tigres UANL
North American SuperLiga: 2009

External links
 
 

1965 births
Living people
Mexico international footballers
C.D. Guadalajara footballers
Atlante F.C. footballers
Club Puebla players
Atlas F.C. footballers
C.F. Pachuca players
Santos Laguna footballers
San Jose Earthquakes players
Footballers from Guadalajara, Jalisco
Santos Laguna managers
Liga MX players
Major League Soccer players
C.D. Guadalajara managers
Club Puebla managers
Tigres UANL managers
C.D. Veracruz managers
Tecos F.C. managers
Club Tijuana managers
Mexican footballers
Association football forwards
Mexican expatriate sportspeople in the United States
Expatriate soccer players in the United States
Mexican expatriate footballers
Mexican football managers